Mount Macdonald ( is the highest peak in the Northwest Mackenzie Mountains of Yukon Territory, Canada.

See also
List of the most isolated major summits of Canada
List of extreme summits of Canada

References

Macdonald